Petsamo may refer to:
 Petsamo Province, a province of Finland from 1921 to 1922
 Petsamo, Tampere, a district in Tampere, Finland
 Pechengsky District, Russia, formerly known as Petsamo
 Pechenga (urban-type settlement), Murmansk Oblast, Russia, formerly known as Petsamo

See also
 Battle of Petsamo (1939)
 Raid on Kirkenes and Petsamo

ca:Petsamo